Aimé Boucher (July 23, 1877 – September 9, 1946) was a Canadian politician and notary. He represented riding of Yamaska in the House of Commons of Canada.

Boucher was the son of Wilfrid G. Boucher and Sophia Gill. He was educated at the Seminaire de Nicolet. In 1917, he married Marguerite, the daughter of Jules Allard. He was elected to the House of Commons in 1921 in a by-election as a Member of the Liberal Party to represent Yamaska. Boucher was re-elected in 1921, 1925, 1926, 1930 and 1933 after the last election was declared void in 1932.

References

External links
 

1877 births
1946 deaths
Liberal Party of Canada MPs
Members of the House of Commons of Canada from Quebec
Quebec notaries